Bakerton is an unincorporated community in Clay County, Tennessee, in the United States.

History
A post office was established at Bakerton in 1904, and it closed in 1907. John Baker served as postmaster there, and likely gave the community its name.

References

Unincorporated communities in Clay County, Tennessee
Unincorporated communities in Tennessee